The 2013–14 Weber State Wildcats women's basketball team represents Weber State University during the 2013–14 NCAA Division I women's basketball season. The Wildcats are led by second year head coach Bethann Ord and play their home games at the Dee Events Center. They are members of the Big Sky Conference.

Radio broadcasts
All Wildcats games will be heard on KWCR with Tyson Ewing and M Brandon Garside calling the action. All home games and conference road games will also be streamed with video live online through Watch Big Sky .

Roster

Schedule

|-
!colspan=9 style="background:#FFFFFF; color:#4B2187;"| Exhibition

|-
!colspan=8 style="background:#4B2187; color:#FFFFFF;"| Regular Season

See also
 2013–14 Weber State Wildcats men's basketball team

References

Weber State Wildcats women's basketball seasons
Weber State
Weber State Wildcats
Weber State Wildcats